The following outline is provided as an overview of and topical guide to Senegal:

Senegal – sovereign country located south of the Sénégal River in West Africa. Senegal is bound by the Atlantic Ocean to the west, Mauritania to the north, Mali to the east, and Guinea and Guinea-Bissau to the south. Dakar is the capital city of Senegal, located on the Cape Verde Peninsula on the country's Atlantic coast.

General reference 

 Pronunciation: 
 Common English country name:  Senegal
 Official English country name:  The Republic of Senegal
 Common endonym: Senegal
 Official endonym: République du Senegal
 Adjectival(s): Senegalese
 Demonym(s):
 International rankings of Senegal
 ISO country codes:  SN, SEN, 686
 ISO region codes:  See ISO 3166-2:SN
 Internet country code top-level domain:  .sn

Geography of Senegal 

 Senegal is: a country
 Population of Senegal: 12,379,000  - 70th most populous country
 Area of Senegal: 196,723 km2
 Atlas of Senegal

Location 
 Senegal is situated within the following regions:
 Northern Hemisphere and Western Hemisphere
 Africa
 West Africa
 Time zone:  Coordinated Universal Time UTC+00
 Extreme points of Senegal
 High:  unnamed feature 2.7 km southeast of Nepen Diakha 
 Low:  North Atlantic Ocean 0 m
 Land boundaries:  2,640 km
 813 km
 740 km
 419 km
 338 km
 330 km
 Coastline:  North Atlantic Ocean 531 km

Environment of Senegal 

 Climate of Senegal
 Ecological Monitoring Centre, Senegal
 Protected areas of Senegal
 Biosphere reserves in Senegal
 National parks of Senegal
 Wildlife of Senegal
 Fauna of Senegal
 Birds of Senegal
 Mammals of Senegal

Natural geographic features of Senegal 
 Glaciers in Senegal: none 
 Islands of Senegal
 Rivers of Senegal
 World Heritage Sites in Senegal

Regions of Senegal

Ecoregions of Senegal 

List of ecoregions in Senegal

Administrative divisions of Senegal 

Administrative divisions of Senegal
 Regions of Senegal
 Departments of Senegal
 Arrondissements of Senegal

Regions of Senegal 

Regions of Senegal

Departments of Senegal 

Departments of Senegal

Arrondissements of Senegal 

Arrondissements of Senegal

Demography of Senegal 

Demographics of Senegal

Government and politics of Senegal 
Politics of Senegal
 Form of government: semi-presidential, liberal democratic republic
 Capital of Senegal: Dakar
 Elections in Senegal
 Political parties in Senegal

Branches of the government of Senegal 

Government of Senegal

Executive branch of the government of Senegal 
 Head of state: President of Senegal,
 Head of government: Prime Minister of Senegal,

Legislative branch of the government of Senegal 
 Parliament of Senegal (bicameral)
 Upper house: Senate of Senegal
 Lower house: House of Commons of Senegal

Judicial branch of the government of Senegal 

Court system of Senegal

Foreign relations of Senegal 

Foreign relations of Senegal
 Diplomatic missions in Senegal
 Diplomatic missions of Senegal

International organization membership 
The Republic of Senegal is a member of:

African, Caribbean, and Pacific Group of States (ACP)
African Development Bank Group (AfDB)
African Union (AU)
African Union/United Nations Hybrid operation in Darfur (UNAMID)
Comunidade dos Países de Língua Portuguesa (CPLP) (associate)
Conference des Ministres des Finances des Pays de la Zone Franc (FZ)
Economic Community of West African States (ECOWAS)
Food and Agriculture Organization (FAO)
Group of 15 (G15)
Group of 77 (G77)
International Atomic Energy Agency (IAEA)
International Bank for Reconstruction and Development (IBRD)
International Chamber of Commerce (ICC)
International Civil Aviation Organization (ICAO)
International Criminal Court (ICCt)
International Criminal Police Organization (Interpol)
International Development Association (IDA)
International Federation of Red Cross and Red Crescent Societies (IFRCS)
International Finance Corporation (IFC)
International Fund for Agricultural Development (IFAD)
International Labour Organization (ILO)
International Maritime Organization (IMO)
International Mobile Satellite Organization (IMSO)
International Monetary Fund (IMF)
International Olympic Committee (IOC)
International Organization for Migration (IOM)
International Organization for Standardization (ISO) (correspondent)
International Red Cross and Red Crescent Movement (ICRM)
International Telecommunication Union (ITU)
International Telecommunications Satellite Organization (ITSO)

International Trade Union Confederation (ITUC)
Inter-Parliamentary Union (IPU)
Islamic Development Bank (IDB)
Multilateral Investment Guarantee Agency (MIGA)
Nonaligned Movement (NAM)
Organisation internationale de la Francophonie (OIF)
Organisation of Islamic Cooperation (OIC)
Organisation for the Prohibition of Chemical Weapons (OPCW)
Permanent Court of Arbitration (PCA)
Union Latine
United Nations (UN)
United Nations Conference on Trade and Development (UNCTAD)
United Nations Educational, Scientific, and Cultural Organization (UNESCO)
United Nations Industrial Development Organization (UNIDO)
United Nations Mission in Liberia (UNMIL)
United Nations Mission in the Central African Republic and Chad (MINURCAT)
United Nations Operation in Cote d'Ivoire (UNOCI)
United Nations Organization Mission in the Democratic Republic of the Congo (MONUC)
Universal Postal Union (UPU)
West African Development Bank (WADB) (regional)
West African Economic and Monetary Union (WAEMU)
World Confederation of Labour (WCL)
World Customs Organization (WCO)
World Federation of Trade Unions (WFTU)
World Health Organization (WHO)
World Intellectual Property Organization (WIPO)
World Meteorological Organization (WMO)
World Tourism Organization (UNWTO)
World Trade Organization (WTO)

Law and order in Senegal 

Law of Senegal
 Constitution of Senegal
 Human rights in Senegal
 LGBT rights in Senegal
 Law enforcement in Senegal

Military of Senegal 

Military of Senegal
 Command
 Commander-in-chief:
 Forces
 Army of Senegal
 Air Force of Senegal

Local government in Senegal 

Local government in Senegal

History of Senegal 

History of Senegal
 Current events of Senegal
 Serer ancient history
 Timeline of Serer history
 Serer history (medieval era to present)

Culture of Senegal 

Culture of Senegal
 Cuisine of Senegal
 Languages of Senegal
 Media in Senegal
 National symbols of Senegal
 Coat of arms of Senegal
 Flag of Senegal
 National anthem of Senegal
 Prostitution in Senegal
 Public holidays in Senegal
 Religion in Senegal
 Buddhism in Senegal
 Hinduism in Senegal
 Islam in Senegal
 Serer religion
 World Heritage Sites in Senegal

Art in Senegal 
 Cinema of Senegal
 Literature of Senegal
 Music of Senegal
 Television in Senegal

Sports in Senegal 

Sports in Senegal
 Football in Senegal
 Senegal at the Olympics

Economy and infrastructure of Senegal 

Economy of Senegal
 Economic rank, by nominal GDP (2007): 112th (one hundred and twelfth)
 Agriculture in Senegal
 Communications in Senegal
 Internet in Senegal
 Companies of Senegal
Currency of Senegal: Franc
ISO 4217: XOF
 Energy in Senegal
 Health care in Senegal
 Mining in Senegal
 Stock Exchange in Senegal: none – Senegal is served by the regional stock exchange Bourse Régionale des Valeurs Mobilières (BRVM) in Abidjan, Cote d'Ivoire.
 Tourism in Senegal
 Transport in Senegal
 Airports in Senegal
 Rail transport in Senegal
 Roads in Senegal
 Water supply and sanitation in Senegal

Education in Senegal 

Education in Senegal

Health in Senegal 

Health in Senegal

See also 

Senegal
Index of Senegal-related articles
List of international rankings
List of Senegal-related topics
Member state of the United Nations
Outline of Africa
Outline of geography

References

External links 

 Government
  Gouvernement du Sénégal—Official governmental website
Embassy of the Republic of Senegal in London government information and links
  Observatoire sur les systèmes d'information, réseaux et inforoutes

 News
 Newspaper Index - Senegal Online Newspapers in Senegal
   Seneweb Senegal news
 allAfrica.com - Senegal news headline links
 SenActu - Senegal news headline links

Information Technologies (IT)
  Syklon Technologies: Société de Services en Ingenierie Informatique au Sénégal et offshore

 Non-Governmental Organizations
 Africa Phonebooks-Senegal NGOs

 Overviews
BBC News Country Profile - Senegal
 CIA World Factbook - Senegal
MSN encarta Senegal overview
Encyclopædia Britannica's Country Page - "Senegal"

 Maps
 UN Map on Senegal

 Literature
 Senegalese literature at a glance

 Music
 Cora Connection West African music resources

 Tourism
Practical information on Senegal with maps, culture, articles ...

Guided Tours of Senegal
The Lonely Planet travel guide on Senegal

 Ethnicity
   Senegals ethnic groups (in french)

 Other
 
  L'Afrique - Sénégal Hundreds of photographs and articles
Senegal shows tolerant face of Islam ...
Movement of the Democratic Force of Casamance
Mineral resources of Senegal
Senegal Photos

Senegal
Outline